Schoinoussa or Schinoussa (before 1940: Σχοινούσα, ; anciently) is an island and a former community in the Cyclades, Greece. Since the 2011 local government reform it is part of the municipality Naxos and Lesser Cyclades, of which it is a municipal unit. It lies south of the island of Naxos, in the Lesser Cyclades group, between the island communities of Irakleia and Koufonisia. The population was 256 inhabitants at the 2011 census.

Description
Schoinoussa is located south of Naxos, in the middle about of the Lesser Cyclades island group. It is the fourth largest island of the Lesser Cyclades and the second most populated, after Ano Koufonisi. The island has three settlements, Chora the capital of the island, Mesaria and Mersini which is the port of the island. The derivation of the name Schinoussa is not precisely known. It is believed that the name either derives from the corruption of the ancient name Echinousa or from a Venetian nobleman named Schinoza. Schoinoussa has been inhabited since antiquity. On the island there are sites of archaeological interest including ancient Greek and Roman ruins, ruins of a Byzantine church and a small medieval castle. From the 11th century, the island was the property of the Hozoviotissa Monastery on the nearby island of Amorgos.

Historical population

Gallery

References

External links
Visit Greece Website 

Islands of Greece
Landforms of Naxos (regional unit)
Islands of the South Aegean
Lesser Cyclades
Populated places in Naxos (regional unit)